Tropical Storm is reggae, dancehall artist Beenie Man's fifteenth studio album. It was released on August 20, 2002. The album is a mix of dancehall and reggae fusion, with hit singles such as "Feel It Boy" featuring R&B singer Janet Jackson and "Bossman" featuring dancehall artists Lady Saw & Sean Paul "Street Life"  backing vocals (Monalisa Young).

Critical reception

Tropical Storm received mixed to positive reviews from music critics. At Metacritic, which assigns a normalized rating out of 100 to reviews from mainstream critics, the album received an average score of 63, which indicates "generally favorable reviews", based on 10 reviews.

Track listing

Album charts

Year-end charts

References

2002 albums
Beenie Man albums
Albums produced by Stargate
Albums produced by the Neptunes